Dimos Baxevanidis (born 14 April 1988) is a Greek professional footballer who plays as a right-back.

He also played for Doxa Drama on loan.

Honours
Xanthi
Greek Cup runner-up: 2014–15

References

External links

1988 births
Living people
Xanthi F.C. players
Doxa Drama F.C. players
Apollon Smyrnis F.C. players
Super League Greece players
Greek footballers
Association football defenders
Footballers from Komotini